Neduvathoor  is a village in Kollam district in the state of Kerala, India.

Demographics
 India census, Neduvathoor had a population of 23951 with 11522 males and 12429 females.

References

Villages in Kollam district